Mohamed Achi (born 16 January 2002) is a French professional footballer who plays as a midfielder for  club Paris 13 Atletico on loan from the Ligue 1 club Nantes.

Early life 
Mohamed Achi was born in Bondy, Île-de-France, where he started playing football, at the local club, along the likes of Ateef Konaté, William Saliba or even his elder Kylian Mbappé, as Kylian's father Wilfried Mbappé was his youth coach there.

Club career 
Having joined the Nantes youth system as a 14-year-old, his promising career was however halted by a serious leg injury, still managing to win the national U17 championship during the 2018–19 season, in a team comprising the likes of Jean-Claude Ntenda, Gor Manvelyan, Jean-Baptiste Gorby and Quentin Merlin. But it was during the following  Coupe Gambardella that he became a prominent figure of the Nantes academy, reaching the quarter finals of the national youth cup, before the competition was eventually canceled because of covid.

Achi signed his first professional contract with Nantes in December 2021, having already become a central piece of the reserve team in National 2, as he had scored 3 goals and delivered 3 assists for 13 appearances during the first part of that season.

He made his first team debut under Antoine Kombouaré's management on the 21 May 2022, replacing Randal Kolo Muani during a 1–1 home Ligue 1 draw against Saint-Étienne.

On 31 January 2023, Achi was loaned to Paris 13 Atletico in Championnat National.

International career 
Also eligible for the Morocco national team through his origins, Archi was first called up to the France U20 in November 2021, making his debut during a friendly game against Germany where he scored a goal from a 25-meter free kick, temporarily equalizing, before Germany eventually scored a late goal to win the game 3–2. He subsequently became a regular with the French youth selection.

Style of play 
First growing as a number 10 through the youth academies, Achi was later moved to the lower positions of milieu relayeur or defensive midfielder.

Described as a sharp and elegant midfielder, able to make progressive and precise passes, he also added a more aggressive and explosive dimension to his game as he made his first step into professionalism in 2021–22.

Honours 
Nantes
 Championnat National U17: 2018–19

References

External links

2002 births
French sportspeople of Moroccan descent
Sportspeople from Bondy
Footballers from Seine-Saint-Denis
Living people
French footballers
Association football midfielders
France youth international footballers
FC Nantes players
Paris 13 Atletico players
Ligue 1 players
Championnat National 2 players